Tressensia is a genus of flowering plants belonging to the family Apocynaceae.

Its native range is Northeastern Argentina.

Species:
 Tressensia viridis H.A.Keller & S.A.Cáceres

References

Apocynaceae
Apocynaceae genera